Oliver Windholz is a German business executive who is the current CEO of Phoenix Pharmahandel, since February 2014. Prior to his appointment, he served as CEO of Ratiopharm. He concurrently served as an independent director of Comifar and Tamro.

References

German chief executives
Living people
Year of birth missing (living people)